Quern is a former municipality in the district of Schleswig-Flensburg, in Schleswig-Holstein, Germany. Since 1 March 2013, it has been part of the municipality of Steinbergkirche.

References 

Former municipalities in Schleswig-Holstein